Arhopala cleander is a species of butterfly belonging to the lycaenid family. It was described by Cajetan Felder in 1860. It is found in Southeast Asia (Buru, Ambon, Serang, Borneo, Sumatra, Peninsular Malaya, Burma, Thailand, Sulawesi, Banggai and Selajar).

Subspecies
Arhopala cleander cleander (Buru, Ambon, Serang)
Arhopala cleander incerta Moulton, 1911 (Borneo, Sumatra)
Arhopala cleander aphadantas Corbet, 1941 (Peninsular Malaysia)
Arhopala cleander regia (Evans, [1925]) (southern Burma, Thailand)
Arhopala cleander apharida Corbet, 1941 (Lombok, Java)
Arhopala cleander sostrata Fruhstorfer, 1914 (Sulawesi, Banggai, Selajar)

References

Arhopala
Butterflies described in 1860
Butterflies of Asia
Taxa named by Baron Cajetan von Felder